Benzobarbital (Benzonal) is a barbiturate derivative. It has anticonvulsant effects and has been used for the treatment of epilepsy.

It has similar liver enzyme inducing effects to the closely related drug phenobarbital, which may be exploited in some clinical applications.

References 

Barbiturates
GABAA receptor positive allosteric modulators